Estela Giménez Cid (born 29 March 1979 in Madrid, Spain) is a Spanish former rhythmic gymnast who won a gold medal at the 1996 Summer Olympics in the group all-around event. The team was formed by Giménez, Marta Baldó, Nuria Cabanillas, Lorena Guréndez, Estíbaliz Martínez and Tania Lamarca. She won the world championship twice in the three balls/two ribbons discipline.

She was featured on the cover of the Your Shape game for Wii. She was the host of Insert Coin on AXN Spain from 2008 to 2012.

See also
 List of gymnasts
 List of Olympic medalists in gymnastics (women)
 Gymnastics at the Pan American Games
 World Rhythmic Gymnastics Championships
 Gymnastics at the World Games
 Rhythmic Gymnastics European Championships

Notes

References

External links

 
  

1979 births
Living people
Spanish rhythmic gymnasts
Olympic gold medalists for Spain
Gymnasts at the 1996 Summer Olympics
Olympic gymnasts of Spain
Spanish television presenters
Spanish women television presenters
Olympic medalists in gymnastics
Medalists at the 1996 Summer Olympics
Medalists at the Rhythmic Gymnastics World Championships
Gymnasts from Madrid
20th-century Spanish women